Ardabil, Nir, Namin and Sareyn (electoral district) is the largest (by population) electoral district in the Ardabil Province of Iran. This electoral district has a population of 667,585 and elects 3 members of parliament.

1980
MPs in 1980 from the electorate of Ardabil. (1st)
 Bahaadin Alamolhoda
 Esmaeil Khoshnevis
 Fakhradin Mousavi

1984
MPs in 1984 from the electorate of Ardabil. (2nd)
 Mirza Ahmad Amirzadeh
 Ali Mohammad-Gharibani
 Rahim Alizadeh

1988
MPs in 1988 from the electorate of Ardabil. (3rd)
 Ali Mohammad-Gharibani
 Naghi Ghazipour
 Fakhradin Mousavi

1992
MPs in 1992 from the electorate of Ardabil. (4th)
 Ali Mohammad-Gharibani
 Naghi Ghazipour
 Noraladin Noei-Aghdam

1996
MPs in 1996 from the electorate of Ardabil. (5th)
 Ahmad Ghazaei
 Ebrahim Pirnemati
 Fakhradin Mousavi

2000
MPs in 2000 from the electorate of Ardabil, Nir, Namin and Sareyn. (6th)
 Vali Azarvash
 Noraladin Pirmoazzen
 Ali Mohammad-Gharibani

2004
MPs in 2004 from the electorate of Ardabil, Nir, Namin and Sareyn. (7th)
 Vali Azarvash
 Noraladin Pirmoazzen
 Hassan Noei-Aghdam

2008
MPs in 2008 from the electorate of Ardabil, Nir, Namin and Sareyn. (8th)
 Javad Sabour
 Kazem Mousavi
 Ghasem Mohammadi

2012
MPs in 2012 from the electorate of Ardabil, Nir, Namin and Sareyn. (9th)
 Mansour Haghighatpour
 Kamaladin Pirmoazzen
 Mostafa Afzalifard

2016

Notes

References

Electoral districts of Ardabil Province
Namin County
Nir County
Sareyn County
Ardabil County
Deputies of Ardabil, Nir, Namin and Sareyn